Blue Ridge is an unincorporated community in Blue Ridge Township Piatt County, Illinois, United States, on County Route 10 and the Norfolk Southern Railway,  north-northeast of Mansfield.

References

Unincorporated communities in Piatt County, Illinois
Unincorporated communities in Illinois